The Southern Medical Journal (SMJ) is a peer-reviewed medical journal, established by Milton Antony. It is the official publication of the Southern Medical Association. The journal is indexed and abstracted in  Index Medicus, Current Contents, Science Citation Index, and EMBASE.

References

External links 
 
 "Southern Medical Journal". Ovid Technologies.

Monthly journals
English-language journals
General medical journals
Lippincott Williams & Wilkins academic journals
Publications established in 1908